Meteorology, Climatology, and Geophysical Agency (abbreviated BMKG) is an Indonesian non-departmental government agency for meteorology, climatology, and geophysics.

History
Its history began on 1841 with individual observation conducted by Dr. Onnen, the head of hospital in Bogor, and was established as a formal government institution on 1866 by the Dutch East Indies government by the name of Magnetisch en Meteorologisch Observatorium. The agency name changed several times and its current name was given on 6 September 2008.

Tropical Cyclone Warning Centre
Since 1986 the BMKG, has run a Tropical Cyclone Warning Centre (TCWC), within their headquarters in Jakarta. Over the next 12 seasons, the TCWC named and issued international warnings for the area from the Equator to 10°S between 90°E and 125°E. In 1998, the World Meteorological Organization’s RA V Tropical Cyclone Committee recommended that TCWC Perth, in Australia take over warning responsibility on an interim basis until the BMKG's staff had the training to run the TCWC. TCWC Perth then took over the warning and naming responsibilities until the 2007–08 season when they handed it back to TCWC Jakarta. The first depression to be named by TCWC Jakarta came later that year when Cyclone Durga became a Tropical Cyclone within their area of responsibility. During the next two seasons TCWC Jakarta, monitored several tropical cyclones in the North Western Pacific Ocean and the Australian region. At the start of the 2010–11 season, TCWC Jakarta's area of responsibility was then extended out to include the region from the Equator to 10°S between 125°E and 141°E.

Gallery

References

External links 
  Official site
 Tropical Cyclone Warning Centre (TCWC)

Government of Indonesia
Government agencies established in 1866
Governmental meteorological agencies in Asia